The rusty-winged antwren (Herpsilochmus frater) is a species of bird in the family Thamnophilidae.
It is found in Colombia, Bolivia, Brazil, Guyana, Suriname, and Venezuela.
Its natural habitat is subtropical or tropical moist montane forests.

The rusty-winged antwren was formerly treated as a subspecies of the rufous-margined antwren (Herpsilochmus rufimarginatus), collectively called the rufous-winged antwren.

References

rusty-winged antwren
rusty-winged antwren
rusty-winged antwren
rusty-winged antwren